German submarine U-733 was a Type VIIC U-boat of Nazi Germany's Kriegsmarine during World War II. The submarine was laid down on 13 October 1941 at the Schichau-Werke yard at Danzig, launched on 5 September 1942, and commissioned on 14 November 1942 under the command of Oberleutnant zur See Wilhelm von Trotha.

Design
German Type VIIC submarines were preceded by the shorter Type VIIB submarines. U-733 had a displacement of  when at the surface and  while submerged. She had two shafts and two  propellers.

U-733 was fitted with five  torpedo tubes (four fitted at the bow and one at the stern), fourteen torpedoes, one  SK C/35 naval gun, 220 rounds, and two twin  C/30 anti-aircraft guns. The boat had a complement of between forty-four and sixty.

Service history
On 8 April 1943, U-733 collided with Vorpostenboot V 313 outside Gotenhafen port and sank without fatalities. The next week, U-733 was raised and repaired in the Schichau yard. On 15 December 1943, U-733 was re-commissioned under the command of Oblt.z.S. Hans Hellmann. On 5 May 1945, U-733 transferred to Flensburg, were the U-boat was attacked by US aircraft and scuttled after receiving heavy damage.

References

Bibliography

External links

World War II submarines of Germany
German Type VIIC submarines
1943 ships
Ships built in Danzig
U-boats commissioned in 1942
U-boats commissioned in 1943
U-boats sunk in 1943
U-boats sunk in collisions
Maritime incidents in April 1943
U-boats scuttled in 1945
Maritime incidents in May 1945
Ships built by Schichau